The Flood Panels are two double-sided painted panels attributed to Hieronymus Bosch, dating to c. 1514 and now in the Museum Boijmans Van Beuningen in Rotterdam.

Bibliography
Franca Varallo, Bosch, Skira, Milano 2004.

1510s paintings
Paintings depicting Noah
Paintings in the collection of the Museum Boijmans Van Beuningen
Paintings by Hieronymus Bosch